Tropic Appetites is a jazz album by Carla Bley released in 1974, following her debut Escalator over the Hill. The lyrics are contributed by Bley's friend Paul Haines, based on his journeys to Southeast Asia in the preceding years. Unlike on the orchestral Escalator, the band is an octet, with Julie Tippetts as lead vocalist.

Track listing
"What Will Be Left Between Us and the Moon Tonight?" − 11:06
"In India" − 1:11
"Enormous Tots" − 6:06
"Caucasian Bird Riffles" − 5:10
"Funnybird Song" − 1:19
"Indonesian Dock Sucking Supreme" − 8:56
"Song of the Jungle Stream" − 10:15
"Nothing" − 3:35

Personnel
Gato Barbieri (uncredited) − tenor sax, percussion
Carla Bley   −   organ, piano, electric piano, celeste, cello, marimba, percussion, vocals, clavinet, producer, engineer
Paul Haines   −  performer
Dave Holland  −  bass, cello
Howard Johnson − tuba, bass clarinet, baritone sax, soprano sax, vocals
Michael Mantler    −     trombone, trumpet, valve trombone, producer
Toni Marcus   −  violin, viola
Paul Motian   −  drums, percussion
Julie Tippetts − vocals
Karen Mantler - vocals

References

External links

Carla Bley albums
1974 albums
ECM Records albums